Front TV was an international broadcast design and branding firm for television, film and interactive media. Front specialized in creative thinking, network branding, station IDs, film titles, 2D-3D animation, web, print, and sound design. In 2009, Front launched its own TV production arm. Front main headquarters, TV studio, animation and post production facilities were originally located in Toronto, Ontario.

Front TV was founded in 1999 by Jeff Rustia. Their first client was Nickelodeon Philippines, for whom they created several network ID's & on-air promos. Subsequently, Nickelodeon in New York awarded Front to repeat this for its channels in Malaysia, Spain, and India. Front also went and produced visual identities and commercials for other international networks such as HBO Asia and Cinemax, Current TV, CBC and Disney Channel. FRONT's clients include many other international TV network entities including the Republic of Georgia's public broadcaster Georgian Public Broadcaster, Indonesia's national channel Global TV, Vision TV (Canada's multi-faith religious channel), Aboriginal Peoples Television Network (APTN), QTN, (an American gay and lesbian channel), CPAC (Canada's political television), ichannel (Issues Channel) and The Pet Network (a 24-hour pet channel).

Front TV's Facebook account was last updated in September 2013; during that same month, the front.tv domain name expired.

Front TV has been noted for its controversial human resources practices.

References

Playback article 2001 entitled, "FRONT TV EYES THE WORLD", by Mark Dillon
Scene and Heard.ca article about FRONT, by Shawn Micalief
Promax Asia Speaker Biographies, Jeff Rustia, FRONT
Promax Indonesia Speaker, Jeff Rustia, FRONT
Globe and Mail, Report on Business Article about FRONT, entitled "Multimillions" by Paul Webster
Indian Television.com article about FRONT and Jeff Rustia, Designer Promos don't mean Designer Budgets
Visa Article about FRONT
Promax/BDA Russia about Jeff Rustia, FRONT

External links
 
 Facebook account

Notes

Companies based in Toronto
Design companies established in 1999
1999 establishments in Ontario